The 2012 season for  began in January at the Tour Down Under. As a UCI ProTeam, they were automatically invited and obligated to send a squad to every event in the UCI World Tour.

2012 roster
Ages as of 1 January 2012.

Riders who joined the team for the 2012 season

Riders who left the team during or after the 2011 season

Season victories

Footnotes

References

2012 road cycling season by team
UAE Team Emirates
2012 in Italian sport